A referendum on the Saar statute was held in the Saar Protectorate on 23 October 1955. The statute would have made the territory an independent polity under the auspices of a European Commissioner, to be appointed by the Council of Ministers of the Western European Union, while remaining in the economic union with France.

Its rejection by voters was taken as an indication that they would rather reunite with West Germany. On 27 October 1956  France and West Germany concluded the Saar Treaty establishing that Saarland should be allowed to join West Germany as provided by article 23 of its constitution (Grundgesetz). Saarland subsequently became a state of Germany with effect from 1 January 1957.

Results

By constituency

References

Saar
Politics of Saarland
Referendums in Germany
Saar Statute referendum
Saar
Saar
Statute referendum
Saar
Saar